Řezáč is a Czech surname. Notable persons with that name include:

 František Řezáč (cyclist), Czech cyclist
 František Řezáč (wrestler), Czech wrestler
 Jaroslav Řezáč (1886–1974), Czech ice hockey player
 Stanislav Řezáč (born 1973), Czech skier

Czech-language surnames